The 2008 presidential campaign of Fred Thompson, lawyer, lobbyist, character actor and former Senator from Tennessee began on September 5, 2007 after six months of speculation. He was a Republican Party primary candidate seeking to represent his party in the 2008 United States presidential election.

Campaign development

Prelude

On March 11, 2007, Thompson appeared on Fox News Sunday to discuss the possibility of a 2008 candidacy for president. The announcement spurred several grassroots draft movements, including a well-organized draft campaign started by Dean Rice, a former Thompson political aide, in Knoxville, Tennessee. While Thompson had not yet formally announced his intentions, he said he would "leave the door open." He stated that he would not be interested in accepting a hypothetical nomination for vice president, explaining "I don't think I would ever want to do that and be in the second position."

Thompson's March 11 announcement spurred a flurry of conjecture, discussion, and activity on the Internet. A "Draft Fred Thompson" forum site became a particularly popular online forum for supporters. One group of supporters organized under the banner "FredHeadsUSA" with a plan to build a grassroots political movement to expand on Thompson's support on the Internet.

On May 15, Thompson published a video in which he declined to debate Michael Moore about Cuba.

Thompson formed an exploratory committee on June 1, 2007. Unlike most candidate exploratory groups, his organized as a 527 group. Thompson made his first public appearance after this exploratory committee formed on June 2 at the Virginia Republicans annual fund-raising gala in Richmond, Virginia. Shortly thereafter, on June 5, 2007, Thompson launched his official website. The same day, there was a Republican Presidential candidates debate with the then current 10 candidates, from New Hampshire, broadcast on CNN. Thompson was mentioned repeatedly as one of the poll front runners, even though he did not participate.

On June 12, 2007, Thompson appeared on The Tonight Show with Jay Leno. He would not announce his candidacy, but referred to his presidential exploratory committee, which he stated had yielded positive prospects. Leno mentioned that Thompson was #2 in the polls, and asked him if he would at least state if he would like the job of President. Thompson responded that, while he did not crave the job itself, there were things he would like to do that he could only do by holding that office.

In early July 2007, Liz Sidoti of the Associated Press wrote: "Thompson's easygoing, no-nonsense style is clearly his strength and undoubtedly has helped him soar in presidential polls." Tucker Eskew, a Republican strategist unaligned in the race, said, "Smooth is good, but sometimes nitty gritty is essential" and "He'll be tested (but) he has a little time." Meanwhile, he received a flurry of press attention over lobbying work he had done in 1991 and 1992 for a group advocating relaxed regulations on abortion counseling at federally funded clinics. In July 2007, a New York Times article cited Thompson's aides as saying on July 18 that he planned to enter the race just after Labor Day (the first Monday in September), followed by a national announcement tour.

On July 31, 2007, the Thompson committee reported to the IRS that it had raised almost $3.5 million and spent $625,000 in its first month.

Thompson visited Iowa on August 17, 2007, but did not then officially launch his presidential campaign. Thompson was asked by NBC if he was officially in the race for president. Thompson replied with a simple "No." It was also noted that Thompson was already prepping for the Republican debates, so that he would be able to join the other Republican candidates on stage at the events after becoming an announced candidate.

Prior to Thompson's entry into the presidential race on September 5, 2007, the September 10, 2007 issue of Newsweek hit newsstands with a detailed cover story about him.

Official announcement
Thompson declared his intent to seek the nomination on September 5, 2007 on The Tonight Show with Jay Leno. He then began a five-day tour of early voting states, including Iowa, New Hampshire and South Carolina.

The campaign begins
In late September and early October, Fred Thompson made several blunders including not being aware of the Supreme Court decision regarding lethal injection, confusing the party in power during the John Roberts nomination, being unaware of the controversy over drilling for oil in the Everglades, and confusing Russia and the Soviet Union.

On September 27, 2007, PBS television hosted a Republican debate in Baltimore, Maryland, at Morgan State University that aired live on PBS and on www.pbs.org. Thompson, who missed his first debate opportunity since declaring his candidacy, was criticized by event organizers and other GOP candidates for his absence. The October 9, 2007,
CNBC, The Wall Street Journal, and the University of Michigan–Dearborn hosted Republican debate in Dearborn, Michigan, at the Ford Community and Performing Arts Center, featured Thompson in attendance.

In early December, Fred Thompson rejected the NIE report stating that Iran stopped its nuclear weapons program. He later stated that the report should be looked at with skepticism.

Primaries and caucuses
Thompson competed in the Republican primary or caucus in five states. He won 13% of the vote in the Iowa Republican caucuses, trailing Mike Huckabee (34%) and Mitt Romney (25%). John McCain also got 13%, but Thompson received more actual votes. Thompson won 3 of the 12 delegates in the Wyoming Republican County Conventions on January 5, 2008.

On January 15, 2008, Thompson placed 5th in the Michigan Republican primary with 4% of the vote, winning no delegates. He received 8% of the vote and 2 delegates in the Nevada Caucuses, placing 5th, on January 19, 2008.

On January 19, 2008, Thompson placed 3rd in the South Carolina primary with 16% of the vote, earning no delegates. Thompson was counting on a win in the southern conservative state to save his struggling campaign, and his poor showing was seen as a fatal blow to his candidacy.

Withdrawal from race
On January 22, 2008, after finishing third in South Carolina — a primary which he had publicly said he needed to win — Thompson announced his withdrawal from the race. In a statement released by his campaign, Thompson said, "Today, I have withdrawn my candidacy for president of the United States. I hope that my country and my party have benefited from our having made this effort." He did not immediately endorse any of the remaining candidates, but in February 2008 endorsed John McCain.

Campaign staff and policy team
Political insiders in Tennessee expected the inner circle of a Thompson campaign to include, in addition to his politically experienced wife, a number of functionaries with whom Thompson has been associated in the past. Thompson's chief fundraiser was Wyatt A. Stewart, a former fundraiser for the National Republican Congressional Committee. Also said to be likely senior advisers were former Republican National Committee chair Ed Gillespie, former vice president of the food and tobacco company Altria Tom Collamore, PR advisor Mark Corallo, former chairman of the Federal Election Commission Michael E. Toner, former Senate aide Tom Daffron, longtime Tennessee politician Tom Ingram, and Congressman Zach Wamp.
On July 24, 2007, Thompson announced he was replacing his acting campaign manager, Tom Collamore, with former Michigan Senator and Secretary of Energy Spencer Abraham and Florida GOP strategist Randy Enright. Collamore would remain as an advisor, Enright would be political director, and Abraham did not have a title. On August 8, 2007, Bill Lacy was named manager of Thompson's "testing the waters committee". Lacy had worked in the campaigns of Presidents Reagan and Bush, as well as Senator Bob Dole, and had worked on Thompson's 1994 campaign.

Political positions

Thompson described Federalism as his "lodestar", providing "a basis for a proper analysis of most issues: 'Is this something government should be doing? If so, at what level of government?'"

Thompson supported free trade and low taxes. He was a self-described authentic conservative since he was part of the Conservative Revolution of the 90s. He said that Roe v. Wade was a wrong decision that ought to be overturned, and that he was anti-abortion, but he also said that states should decide not to criminalize young women for early term abortions. Thompson was skeptical that humanity is to blame for global warming. He said citizens are entitled to keep and bear arms if they do not have criminal records. Thompson's support of the McCain-Feingold campaign finance legislation brought criticism from groups such as Gun Owners of America (GOA), who said that the legislation limited their ability to inform the public about the gun rights voting records of incumbent politicians. Thompson said that the limitation on political speech within thirty or sixty days of an election was wrong and should be repealed. Thompson said U.S. borders need to be secured before considering comprehensive immigration reform. Thompson supported the U.S. invasion of Iraq, but later stated that mistakes had been made since then. He opposed withdrawal from Iraq. He also believed that Iran should be taken seriously.

Endorsements
January 11, 2008, Human Events, a popular weekly conservative magazine, officially endorsed Thompson saying, "Thompson best represents conservative principles."

On November 13, 2007, the National Right to Life Committee announced its endorsement of Fred Thompson, stating "Our endorsement is a testament to Senator Thompson’s long-standing pro-life record, his commitment to unborn children, and our belief in his ability to win."

As of September 6, 2007, Thompson had been endorsed by 20 current members of Congress, including both Tennessee senators. Also, on June 12, 2007 former U.S. Senator Alfonse D'Amato (New York) endorsed Thompson for president.

Former Senate Majority Leader Howard Baker of Tennessee also expressed his support, saying: "If I had to pick one thing that qualifies him to be president, it's this: he approaches things calmly, deliberately—and he doesn't shoot from the hip."

Thompson received strong support from California legislators, seen in this photo from left, Assemblyman Chuck DeVore Assemblyman Alan Nakanishi, Senator Sam Aanestad Senator Tom McClintock, Thompson, Assemblyman Martin Garrick, Assemblyman Tom Berryhill, and Senator Dave Cogdill. 

U.S. Senator Jim Inhofe (R-OK) 
U.S. Senator Thad Cochran (R-MS) 
U.S. Senator Lamar Alexander (R-TN)
U.S. Senator Bob Corker (R-TN)
U.S. Senator Roger Wicker (R-MS) (fourth cousin of Fred Thompson)
Fmr. U.S. Senator Howard Baker (R-TN) 
Fmr. U.S. Senator Spencer Abraham (R-MI) 
Fmr. U.S. Senator George Allen (R-VA)
Elizabeth Cheney 
Fmr. Texas Court of Appeals Judge Paul Pressler (R-TX) 
 Wyoming State Senator Amy Edmonds (R-WY) 
Former Chair of Wyoming Republican Party Drake Hill (R-WY)  (husband of subsequent Wyoming Superintendent of Public Instruction Cindy Hill)
Missouri Lt. Governor Peter Kinder (R-MO)
Rep. Gresham Barrett (R-SC) 
Rep. Jeff Miller (R-FL) 
Rep. Donald A. Manzullo (R-IL) 
Rep. Adam Putnam (R-FL) 
Rep. Lee Terry (R-Neb)
Rep. John Sullivan (R-Okla)
Rep. Zach Wamp (R-Tenn)
Rep. Lynn Westmoreland (R-GA)
Rep. Sue Myrick (R-N.C)
Rep. Thaddeus McCotter (R-Mich)
Rep. Marsha Blackburn (R-Tenn)
Rep. Dan Burton (R-Ind)
Rep. Steve Buyer (R-Ind)
Rep. David Davis (R-Tenn)
Rep. Jimmy Duncan (R-Tenn)
Rep. Louie Gohmert (R-Texas)
Rep. Steve King (R-IA)
Attorney General of Virginia Robert F. McDonnell
George P. Bush, a member of the Bush family
Pat Sajak, television personality
Fmr. U.S. Senator Alfonse D'Amato (R-NY)

See also
United States Republican presidential candidates, 2008
Republican Party (United States) presidential primaries, 2008
Opinion Polling for the Republican Party

Footnotes

External links

The Fred Thompson Report, ABC Radio Networks (official site).
The Official YouTube Page for Fred Thompson (official video site).
The Official Flickr Page for Fred Thompson (official photo site).
Spartan Internet Political Performance (SIPP) Index - Ranking of Fred Thompson Internet-wide popularity Weekly
The Fred Thompson Papers, University of Tennessee (official archive).
 
 acting career.
The Fred Files Lobbying disclosures, 1975–1994.
Fred Thompson Hometown Biography, Lawrenceburg Tennessee

2008 Republican Party (United States) presidential campaigns